Margaret Ann Lipton (August 30, 1946 – May 11, 2019) was an American actress, model, and singer. She made appearances in many of the most popular television shows of the 1960s before she landed her defining role as flower child Julie Barnes in the crime drama The Mod Squad (1968–1973), for which she won the Golden Globe Award for Best Actress – Television Series Drama in 1970.

After The Mod Squad, Lipton married musician Quincy Jones and began a 15-year hiatus from acting, during which she raised her two children, Kidada and Rashida Jones. She returned to acting in 1988, performing in many TV roles, including Norma Jennings in David Lynch's Twin Peaks.

Early life
Lipton was born Margaret Ann Lipton into an upper middle-class Jewish family in New York City on August 30, 1946, the daughter of artist Rita Benson (born Rita Hetty Rosenberg) and corporate lawyer Harold Lipton. Her paternal grandparents (surnamed Lipschitz) were Jewish immigrants from Russia, and her mother was born in Dublin, Ireland, to Jewish parents from Latvia. Lipton was raised on Long Island with her brothers: Robert, who became an actor, and Kenneth. She attended Lawrence Junior High School and the Professional Children's School. Sexually abused by an uncle, Lipton was a nervous and withdrawn child with a stutter so severe that she was sometimes unable to say her own name. In 1964, the family moved to Los Angeles, where Lipton became what she called a "Topanga Canyon hippie" who explored meditation and yoga.

Career

Modeling and acting
Lipton's father arranged her first modeling jobs in New York, while her mother encouraged her to take acting lessons. At 15, Lipton became a Ford Agency model and enjoyed a successful early career. After she and her family moved to Los Angeles in 1964, Lipton signed a contract with Universal Pictures. She made her television debut at age 19 in the NBC sitcom The John Forsythe Show (1965). Between 1965 and 1968, she appeared in episodes of Bewitched, The Virginian, The Invaders, The Road West, The F.B.I., The Alfred Hitchcock Hour, and Mr. Novak.

Lipton starred in The Mod Squad as one of a trio of Los Angeles undercover "hippie cops". Appearing waiflike and vulnerable, as David Hutchings wrote, her performance as "canary with a broken wing" Julie Barnes earned her four Emmy Award nominations and four Golden Globe Award nominations during her tenure. In 1971, she won a Golden Globe Award for Best TV Actress in a Drama. Thin with long, straight, ash blonde hair, clad in mini-skirts, bell bottoms, and love beads, Lipton's Julie Barnes became a fashion icon and the hip "it girl" of her time.

After The Mod Squad, Lipton did no full-time acting for 15 years. In March 1988, she returned to television as the star of an ABC movie, Addicted to His Love. She eventually regained major attention for her performance as Norma Jennings in David Lynch's TV series Twin Peaks (1990–1991), and subsequently appeared in many TV shows, including recurring roles in Crash and Popular. In 2017 she reprised her character of Norma Jennings in the Twin Peaks revival. Also in 2017, she appeared in an episode of Angie Tribeca as the mother of the title character played by her daughter Rashida Jones.

Singing
As a singer, three of Lipton's singles landed on the Billboard charts: "Stoney End" (No. 121 Bubbling Under Hot 100, 1968, later a Top Ten hit for Barbra Streisand in 1970) and "Lu" (1970), both written by Laura Nyro. Her "Wear Your Love Like Heaven" (1970) was written by Donovan. "Stoney End" is included in her 1968 album Peggy Lipton (Ode Records), which was released on CD on July 29, 2014, by RealGone Music, along with other singles and previously unreleased material (nineteen tracks in all).

Lipton and her husband Quincy Jones, along with Alan and Marilyn Bergman, co-wrote the 1984 Frank Sinatra hit, "L.A. Is My Lady".

Personal life
Lipton was briefly linked with Paul McCartney. At the age of eighteen, she began using drugs in an attempt to alleviate her depression. After Lipton married musician and producer Quincy Jones in 1974, she took a hiatus from acting to concentrate on her family (with the exception of appearing in the made-for-TV movie The Return of the Mod Squad in 1979). The couple had two daughters, Kidada and Rashida, who both became actresses. Lipton and Jones separated in 1986, and divorced in 1989.

Death
After being diagnosed in 2004, Lipton died of colon cancer in Los Angeles on May 11, 2019.

Discography
1968 Peggy Lipton (Ode Records)
2013 Peggy Lipton: The Complete Ode Recordings (Vivid Sound)

Singles 
1968 "Wear Your Love Like Heaven" b/w "Honey Won't Let Me" (45 rpm) (Record World AC #40)
1968 "Stoney End" b/w "San Francisco Glide" (45 rpm) (Billboard #121)
1969 "Red Clay County Line" b/w "Just A Little Lovin' (Early In The Morning)" (45 rpm)
1970 "Lu" / "Let Me Pass By" (45 rpm) (#45 Canada, February 1970)
1970 "Let Me Pass By" b/w "Hands Off the Man (Flim Flam Man)" (45 rpm)

Filmography

Film

Television

See also

References

External links

1946 births
2019 deaths
20th-century American actresses
20th-century American singers
20th-century American women singers
21st-century American actresses
Actresses from New York City
American female models
American women pop singers
American film actresses
American memoirists
American people of Irish-Jewish descent
American people of Latvian-Jewish descent
American people of Russian-Jewish descent
American stage actresses
American television actresses
American Ashkenazi Jews
Best Drama Actress Golden Globe (television) winners
Burials at Hillside Memorial Park Cemetery
Deaths from cancer in California
Deaths from colorectal cancer
Female models from New York (state)
Jewish American actresses
Jewish American musicians
Jewish American writers
Jewish female models
Jewish singers
Models from New York City
Ode Records artists
People from Lawrence, Nassau County, New York
Family of Quincy Jones
Singers from New York City
Writers from New York City
21st-century American Jews